El Salvador competed in the Olympic Games for the first time at the 1968 Summer Olympics in Mexico City, Mexico, from 12 to 27 October 1968.

Comité Olímpico de El Salvador sent a total of 60 athletes to the Games, 52 men and 8 women, to compete in 7 sports. Swimmer Salvador Vilanova was selected to carry his nation's flag during the opening ceremony.

Competitors 
Comité Olímpico de El Salvador selected a team of 60 athletes, 52 men and 8 women, to compete in 7 sports. The contingent marks the largest in El Salvador's Olympic participation. Trap shooter Roberto Soundy, at age 68, was the oldest athlete of the team, while swimmer Rubén Guerrero was the youngest at age 13. Each respectively holds the distinction of being the all-time oldest and youngest Olympic participants from El Salvador.

The following is the list of number of competitors participating in the Games.

Athletics

Men
Track & road events

Field events

Women
Track & road events

Field events

Cycling

Road
Men

Football

Men
Team roster
Head coach: Rigoberto Guzmán

Group play

El Salvador did not advance to the quarterfinal.

Sailing

Men

Shooting

Eight shooters represented El Salvador in 1968.

Men

Swimming

Men

Women

Weightlifting

Men

References

External links
Official Olympic Reports
"El Salvador at the 1968 Ciudad de México Summer Games." Sports-Reference.com. Retrieved on 15 March 2014.

Nations at the 1968 Summer Olympics
1968
Olympics